The Women's 100 metre breaststroke SB9 event at the 2020 Paralympic Games took place on 26 August 2021, at the Tokyo Aquatics Centre.

Heats

The swimmers with the top eight times, regardless of heat, advanced to the final.

Final

References

Swimming at the 2020 Summer Paralympics
2021 in women's swimming